MidSun Junior High School is a Canadian middle school teaching grades seven through nine for the communities of Midnapore, Chaparral and Sundance, in Calgary, Alberta.  It is part of the public Calgary Board of Education.  When opened in 1998 it was designed with a capacity of 750 students, and quickly gained enrollment of slightly less, or slightly more, than that figure.

The need for a new junior high school (middle school) to alleviate busing concerns arose in 1996.  The efforts of the community were met with success, and the school was opened for the fall of 1998.  In 2006, students started coming from the community of Lake Chaparral.  Currently, students graduating from MidSun Junior High attend Centennial High School.

The school has a Learning Resource Center (LRC), designed for special needs students. It also has a French as a Second Language program.

MidSun's network integrates Windows networking throughout the entire building.  There are approximately 80 computers available for student use in the building.  The school is divided into four distinct pods (Blue, Gold, Red, Green), each housing a different age group.  These have been described as 'schools within a school'.

References
 Derworiz, Colette "Awards give high marks to teachers, programs", Calgary Herald. Calgary, Alta.: May 30, 2001. pg. B.5 
 Knapp, Shelley.  "Teachers pan call for longer days" Calgary Herald. Calgary, Alta.: December 17, 2002. pg. B.3
 Williams, Juliet.  "Schools cater to students' high-tech needs: Calgary's two newest schools are wired -- and no longer dark and dingy", Calgary Herald. Calgary, Alberta: August 12, 1998. p. EL.06.

External links
 MidSun Junior High School
 Calgary Board of Education's school profile

Middle schools in Calgary
Educational institutions established in 1998
1998 establishments in Alberta